Sir Gaëtan Duval Stadium is a multi-use stadium in Beau Bassin-Rose Hill, Plaines Wilhems District, Mauritius.  It is currently used mostly for football matches and is the home stadium of US Beau Bassin-Rose Hill.  The stadium holds 6,500 people.

References

Football venues in Mauritius